Guene may refer to:

Guénè, Benin
Guene language, a secret language among the slaves of West Curaçao, which may have influenced Papiamento

People with the surname Guene include:
Charles Guené (born 1952), French politician
Faïza Guène (born 1985), French writer and director

See also
Güeñes, Spain